Rissoella opalina is a species of sea snail, a marine gastropod mollusk in the family Rissoellidae.

Distribution
Ireland.

References

External links

Rissoellidae
Gastropods described in 1848